Prussian War may refer to:

 Polish–Teutonic War (1519–21)

See also
Wars and battles involving Prussia